İsmail Cem Ulusoy (born 4 October 1996) is a Turkish professional basketball player who plays as a point guard for Petkim Spor of the Turkish Basketball Super League (BSL).

External links
İsmail Cem Ulusoy Banvit Profile
İsmail Cem Ulusoy TBLStat.net Profile
İsmail Cem Ulusoy Eurobasket Profile

1996 births
Living people
Bandırma B.İ.K. players
Gaziantep Basketbol players
Petkim Spor players
Point guards
Sportspeople from Antalya
Turkish men's basketball players